The Jacaré River is a river of Bahia state in eastern Brazil. It is a tributary of the São Francisco River.

The river basin includes part of the  Morro do Chapéu State Park, created in 1998.

See also
List of rivers of Bahia

References

Brazilian Ministry of Transport

Rivers of Bahia